The 1977 Pacific Tigers football team represented the University of the Pacific (UOP) in the 1977 NCAA Division I football season as a member of the Pacific Coast Athletic Association.

The team was led by head coach Chester Caddas, in his sixth year, and played their home games at Pacific Memorial Stadium in Stockton, California. They finished the season with a record of six wins and five losses (6–5, 3–1 PCAA). The Tigers outscored their opponents 230–161 over the season.

Schedule

Team players in the NFL
The following UOP players were selected in the 1978 NFL Draft.

The following finished their college career in 1977, were not drafted, but played in the NFL.

Notes

References

Pacific
Pacific Tigers football seasons
Pacific Tigers football